Mussa is an administrative ward in the Arusha Rural District of the Arusha Region of Tanzania. According to the 2012 census, the ward has a total population of 11,836.

References

Wards of Arusha District
Wards of Arusha Region